Anuvab Pal (born 27 April 1976) is an Indian stand up comedian, screenwriter, playwright and novelist. He is occasionally featured as a rotating co-host on Season 4 of the podcast The Bugle.

Career 
Pal co-wrote the 2007 Indian comedy, Loins Of Punjab Presents, with Manish Acharya which The New York Times called 'a witty musical comedy'.

In 2009, his play, The President Is Coming, was made into a Bollywood film The President Is Coming made by producer Rohan Sippy.

As a stand up comedian, Pal started out with The British Comedy Store when they opened in Mumbai in 2010 and has since toured across the nation with his one-man show, The Nation Wants To Know in Mumbai, New Delhi, Kolkata, Shillong, Bangalore, and Pune.

His first play Chaos Theory, a love story between two Indian professors, was written in New York City, and performed in various productions around the United States. The Los Angeles Times, while writing about the Artwallah Festival, a South Asian cultural festival where the play was performed in 2003, said 'Pal's characters are professional immigrants whose questions may not be so much about economic survival as intellectual and spiritual survival. The play received its first professional production in New York City in 2010 starring TV and film actor Rita Wolf, directed by Alexa Kelly and produced by The Pulse Ensemble Theatre.

The India production of the play happened in 2008 and starred TV and theatre actor Zafar Karachiwala and TV, film and theatre actor Anahita Oberoi directed by theatre director Rahul Da Cunha and produced by his Rage Productions.

In 2011, he was featured in a New York Times video, 'A Night At The Comedy Club' and CNN Go, a travel website of CNN, mentioned him on a list of '20 Mumbai People To Watch'.

He was also interviewed in the BBC News segment titled 'Having A Laugh In India' and was, along with comedian and presenter Cyrus Broacha, the only Indian comedian on the popular BBC Radio 4 show Just A Minute with Nicholas Parsons. That episode also featured famous British comedians Paul Merton and Marcus Brigstocke.

He contributes columns often to magazines like Time Out Mumbai. Three of his plays, Chaos Theory, The President Is Coming and 1 888 Dial India have been published as novels. He has also written a non fiction book on the Bollywood movie, Disco Dancer.

Pal had his stand up special Alive At 40, featured on the Amazon Prime platform. In 2018, his 8 episode comedy Going Viral starring Kunaal Roy Kapur was produced by Amazon Prime.

In Feb 2018, Anuvab Pal did his stand up special The Nation Wants To Know at Harvard Business School, as part of the Harvard South Asia Conference.

In May 2018, Anuvab premiered his stand up special, The Empire, in London Soho Theatre. Followed by this, in August he made his debut at Edinburgh Festival Fringe with the same show which was met with good reception.

In 2018, Pal appeared on four different shows for the BBC. He debuted on BBC's Fresh from the Fringe, performing highlights of his Edinburgh Festival show. He made an appearance on BBC 2's Big Asian Stand Up as part of BBC's The British Asian Summer. His two-part radio series with Andy Zaltzman titled Empire-ical Evidence, tracing the legacy of The Empire in London and Kolkata was broadcast on BBC Radio 4 in October 2018. In December 2018, Pal was invited by the BBC World Service Arts Hour to The Arts Hour New Year International Comedy Show. He also appeared on QI, on the third episode of the seventeenth series, on the topic of "Quarrels".

In late summer 2018, Anuvab became the first Indian comedian to perform before a sell out crowd at The Lund Comedy Festival in Lund, Sweden. 

In 2019, he performed for the first time at The Melbourne Comedy Festival in a show titled 'Indian All-Star Comedy Showcase'

In 2020, his long running podcast Our Last Week with Anuvab and Kunaal, also featuring Bollywood actor Kunaal Roy Kapur, produced by Audiomatic, was picked up by Spotify as a Spotify original exclusive for India. The Hindu newspaper, referring to the podcast, called the hosts, 'The Kings of nonsensical banter' 
The podcast was also featured by NPR in a show titled Code Switch in August 2016. The segment was titled 'What's so funny about The Indian Accent?'

In 2020, Pal wrote a sitcom for Amazon Prime India directed by Rohan Sippy, with the pandemic as the backdrop. It was titled 'Wakaalat From Home' and starred Sumeet Vyas, Kubbra Sait, Nidhi Singh and Gopal Datt. Indian Express in its review, called it 'a must watch show'.

In 2020, he was also a panelist on the BBC Radio 4 show The News Quiz hosted by Andy Zaltzman

In 2021, according to an article in The Guardian, BBC announced that Pal's sitcom pilot titled Empire would feature as part of Festival Of Funny, on BBC Radio 2. Empire stars famous British actor, comedian, writer, presenter Stephen Fry. 

In 2022, post pandemic, Anuvab returned to Soho Theatre with his Edinburgh show 'Democracy and Disco Dancing', which received a series of 4 star reviews. Reviewers said the show was a 'laugh a minute' and 'hilariously absurd'. 

He also appeared as a panelist in a number of BBC radio shows including The BBC Radio Scotland show ''The Good, The Bad and The Unexpected' and 
'Comedians Vs The News' on BBC World Service. 

Chortle, the British comedy website, announced on 22 December 2021, that Anuvab Pal and Mark Watson would be part of a Soho Theatre line up of stand up comedy specials on Amazon Prime Video UK. Anuvab's show The Empire was recorded at Soho Theatre in London in January 2021. The release date is scheduled for May 6, 2022.

References

External links
 

Indian stand-up comedians
Living people
Ohio Wesleyan University alumni
1976 births